Weifang is a prefecture-level city in central Shandong province, People's Republic of China. The city borders Dongying to the northwest, Zibo to the west, Linyi to the southwest, Rizhao to the south, Qingdao to the east, and looks out to the Laizhou Bay to the north. Its population was 9,386,705 at the 2020 census, of whom 3,095,520 lived in the built-up (or metro) area made up of four urban districts (Kuiwen, Weicheng, Hanting and Fangzi) and Changle County largely being urbanized.

Weifang has numerous natural and historic sites, such as Shihu Garden (from the Late Ming and early Qing Dynasty), Fangong Pavilion (from the Song Dynasty), fossil sites (including dinosaur fossils, in Shanwang, Linqu), Mount Yi National Forest Park, Mount Qingyun and the Old Dragon Spring.  Painted New Year woodcuts from Yangjiabu are also well known. The city is served by Weifang Nanyuan Airport to various cities across China.

Administration
The prefecture-level city of Weifang administers 12 county-level divisions, including four districts, six county-level cities and two counties.

Geography and Climate
Nearby major cities include Jinan and Zibo to the west, Yantai to the northeast and Qingdao to the southeast.

Weifang has a monsoon-influenced, four-season humid continental climate (Köppen Dwa), with hot, humid summers, and cold but dry winters. More than 70% of the annual precipitation occurs from June to September, and sunshine is generally abundant year-round. A majority of the annual precipitation occurs in July and August alone. With monthly percent possible sunshine ranging from 47% in July to 62% in April, the city receives 2,536 hours of bright sunshine annually, sunshine is abundant except during the summer months.

Economy
The city is home to the large diesel engine company and factory Weichai. The village of Yangjiabu in Hanting District is famous for folk wood-block print (nianhua) and kite production.

In the 1980s, many sapphire deposits were discovered in Changle County. Mining here has become one of the top four sapphire producers in the world. The main feature of this sapphire is the dark blue or close to black color because of the high iron content.

Established in August 1995, the Weifang Binhai Economic & Technological Development Area (BEDA) is a national economic and technological development area approved by the State Council. BEDA has been accredited as a National Demonstration Zone invigorating the Sea by Science and Technology, National Innovation Base for Rejuvenating Trade through Science and Technology and National Demonstration Eco-Industry Park.

Military 
Weifang is the headquarters of the 26th Group Army of the People's Liberation Army, one of the three group armies that comprise the Jinan Military Region responsible for defense of the Yellow River Plain.

Culture

Kite flying

Kite flying is a traditional custom among the people in Weifang in spring time. In 1984, the first international kite festival was held in Weifang. More than ten thousand kite fans attended the opening ceremony. People from eleven countries and regions, including the United States and Canada, took part in the festival, flying kites. Since then, Weifang holds the Weifang International Kite Festival each year. It is held each April.

Painting
Annual Board of Yangjiabu, one of the three most famous Chinese folk paintings in history, began from the end of the Ming Dynasty. It reached the peak of its development during the Qing Dynasty. People usually replace the old Annual Broads with the new ones on the eve of Spring Festival, which is the most important festival in China, in order to give blessings to the family and friends for the following year. The subjects of Annual Board of Yangjiabu are various, which include flowers, beauties, landscapes, characters from myths and legends.  The architecture skills such as concise lines and bright colors reflect the distinctive characteristics of people in Weifang.

Papercutting

Papercutting, the art of cutting paper designs, has a long history in the city of Gaomi. This widespread handicraft has unique styles, such as strong contrast in color, straight and simple line and exaggerated outline. The characters mostly come from the dramatic stories, flowers and birds, as well as some fantastic symbols.

Cuisine
There are three dishes representative of Weifang:

Ji-Ya Hele Weifang Ji-Ya Hele is said to have originated in Shanxi province. Later on, it was brought to Weifang. The name "Hele", a kind of noodle, was developed from the word "Helou", a noodle name once used in history. Weifang Ji-Ya Hele is cooked with various ingredients, stewed with chicken and duck soup. To make delicious "Hele" Noodles, we need to put the "Hele" noodles into the pot. After it is fully boiled, chicken, duck, Sliced Meatball, salted vegetables or spicy oil is added into the noodles.  In 1997, Ji-Ya Hele was honored as a "Chinese Famous Snack" by China Cuisine Association.
Rou Huo Shao Meat Pie is the most famous cuisine in Weifang. Weifang Meat Pie has a long history and variety. "Mirror" recorded in Han Zhao Qi people living in the North Sea (i.e. Weifang) to sell Weifang Meat pie for a living. This is an example of an earlier business written records since the Meat pIe. Whether it is in the morning or at noon, in front of the shop is always a long row waiting for the pie. The shop is generally build along the street. Bite, coke dough rattling, in a high temperature furnace after repeatedly turning roast, pork moisten the green onion, egg, chopped dried shrimps fillings inside, aroma, mouth-watering produce the feeling, entrance juicy, full taste, people aftertaste.
Chao Tian Guo. Chao Tian Guo is a local specialties of Weifang. This food is known as created by Zheng Banqiao in Qianlong period of Qing dynasty. The main materials of Chao Tian Guo is thin pancake, meat ball, pig offal, tofu, and soy with the soup. The merchants use a huge pot to cook these materials and the customers can sit around this pot. The reason why it called Chao Tian Guo is "Chao Tian" in Chinese means the pot has no cover and the pot is facing to the sky ("Guo" in Chinese is means pot).

Education
Weifang University and Weifang Medical University are universities in the city.

Notable people

Zheng Xuan (127–200), Eastern Han Dynasty Confucian scholar
Liu Yong (1719–1805), renowned Qing Dynasty bureaucrat
Mo Yan (born 1955), real named Guan Moye, renowned writer, awarded Nobel Prize for Literature in 2012
Wang Xiaoyun (born 1966), cryptographer, mathematician, and computer scientist
Sun Feifei (born 1989), fashion model
Emperor Shun of the Three Sovereigns and Five Emperors period 
Yan Ying, Spring and Autumn period politician
Jia Sixie, Northern Wei Dynasty agriculturist

In addition, Kong Rong, Fan Zhongyan, Ouyang Xiu, Su Dongpo, Zheng Banqiao, et al. have worked in Weifang historically. Examples of notable individuals from the city in more recent years include Wang Jinmei, Chen Shaomin, Wang Yuanjian, Wang Tongzhao and Zang Kejia.

References

External links

Government website of Weifang (in Simplified Chinese)
Official website of the Weifang International Kite Festival (in Simplified Chinese)
Yangjiabu Nianhua (in Simplified Chinese)
Weifang Medical University students website (in Simplified Chinese)
 Weifang News (In Simplified Chinese)
 Weifang Information (In Simplified Chinese)
 Weifang Binhai (In Simplified Chinese)
 Doing business in China (In Simplified English)

 
Cities in Shandong
Prefecture-level divisions of Shandong